Allouez is a village in Brown County in the U.S. state of Wisconsin. The population was 13,975 at the 2010 census. It is part of the Green Bay Metropolitan Statistical Area.

Geography
Allouez is located between Green Bay to the north, and De Pere to the south. The Fox River forms a natural border to the west and the East River to the east.

Climate

History
The village of Allouez was named after the French Jesuit priest and missionary, Father Claude-Jean Allouez. The Cadle Mission, a mission of the Episcopal Church for the Native Americans, was located in the village in the nineteenth century.

Demographics

2010 census
As of the census of 2010, there were 13,975 people, 5,432 households, and 3,580 families living in the village. The racial makeup of the village was 89.7% White, 5.0% African American, 1.0% Native American, 1.8% Asian, 0.1% Pacific Islander, 1.0% from other races, and 1.5% from two or more races. Hispanic or Latino of any race were 2.7% of the population.

There were 5,432 households, of which 28.3% had children under the age of 18 living with them, 54.8% were married couples living together, 7.9% had a female householder with no husband present, 3.2% had a male householder with no wife present, and 34.1% were non-families. 28.0% of all households were made up of individuals, and 12.5% had someone living alone who was 65 years of age or older. The average household size was 2.35 and the average family size was 2.88.

The median age in the village was 41 years. 20.5% of residents were under the age of 18; 7.8% were between the ages of 18 and 24; 26.4% were from 25 to 44; 28.5% were from 45 to 64; and 16.7% were 65 years of age or older. The gender makeup of the village was 52.3% male and 47.7% female.

2000 census
As of the census of 2000, there were 15,443 people, 5,397 households, and 3,815 families living in the village. The population density was 3,338.8 people per square mile (1,287.8/km2). There were 5,512 housing units at an average density of 1,191.7 per square mile (459.7/km2). The racial makeup of the village was 92.07% White, 4.64% African American, 1.15% Native American, 0.84% Asian, 0.01% Pacific Islander, 0.62% from other races, and 0.67% from two or more races. Hispanic or Latino of any race were 1.29% of the population.

There were 5,397 households, out of which 32.1% had children under the age of 18 living with them, 61.5% were married couples living together, 7.2% had a female householder with no husband present, and 29.3% were non-families. 24.3% of all households were made up of individuals, and 10.3% had someone living alone who was 65 years of age or older. The average household size was 2.45 and the average family size was 2.95.

In the village, the population was spread out, with 22.1% under the age of 18, 9.0% from 18 to 24, 31.0% from 25 to 44, 23.1% from 45 to 64, and 14.7% who were 65 years of age or older. The median age was 38 years. For every 100 females, there were 115.5 males. For every 100 females age 18 and over, there were 117.4 males.

The median income for a household in the village was $55,850, and the median income for a family was $62,855. Males had a median income of $40,055 versus $26,822 for females. The per capita income for the village was $25,535. About 1.4% of families and 3.5% of the population were below the poverty line, including 3.2% of those under age 18 and 7.6% of those age 65 or over.

Transportation
WIS 172 and WIS 57 go through the Village. Limited transit service is provided by Green Bay Metro.

Law enforcement
The village of Allouez contracts police services through the Brown County Sheriff's Office, which assigns one officer to patrol the village.

Notable people
 Winford Abrams, former mayor of Green Bay
 James R. Charneski, former member of the Wisconsin State Assembly
 Paul Gigot, political commentator
 Vince Lombardi, former head coach of the Green Bay Packers
 Dennis Murphy, American Civil War Medal of Honor recipient
 Donald Tilleman, former mayor of Green Bay

References

External links
 Village of Allouez, Wisconsin

Villages in Wisconsin
Villages in Brown County, Wisconsin
Green Bay metropolitan area